Bovegno is a comune in the province of Brescia, in Lombardy. It borders the communes of Artogne, Berzo Inferiore, Bienno, Collio, Esine, Gianico, Irma, Marmentino and Pezzaze. It is located in the valley named Val Trompia.

The Brescian poet Angelo Canossi spent the last years of his life here, mainly at Cà de le bachere (now a national monument) in Val Sorda.

Notes

Twin towns
 Narcao, Italy

References

Cities and towns in Lombardy
Hilltowns in Lombardy